Danila Nechayev (born 30 October 1999) is a Belarusian professional footballer who plays for BATE Borisov.

International career
He made his debut for Belarus national football team on 24 March 2021 in a friendly against Honduras.

Honours
BATE Borisov
Belarusian Cup winner: 2020–21
Belarusian Super Cup winner: 2022

References

External links 
 
 

1999 births
Living people
People from Mogilev
Sportspeople from Mogilev Region
Belarusian footballers
Belarus international footballers
Belarus under-21 international footballers
Association football defenders
FC Dnepr Mogilev players
FC Dnyapro Mogilev players
FC Lida players
FC Belshina Bobruisk players
FC BATE Borisov players